CHUV is a Lausanne Métro station on M2 line. It was opened on 27 October 2008 as part of the inaugural section of the line, from Croisettes to Ouchy–Olympique. The station is located between Sallaz and Ours. The name of the station originates from the Lausanne University Hospital, Centre hospitalier universitaire vaudois in French.

References

Railway stations in Switzerland opened in 2008
Lausanne Metro stations